The Flesh Alive is a live album by the heavy metal band Gojira. It was released in 2012 on Mascot Label. Most of the tracks are taken from the album The Way of All Flesh.

Commercial performance
The Flesh Alive peaked at No. 76 on the France Top Albums chart. The live DVD set debuted at No. 24 on the Dutch DVD Music Top 30 in the Netherlands. It entered at No. 10 on the Ultratop Belgian chart and moved up to number No. 7 one week later. The Flesh Alive debuted at No. 13 on the Billboard Top DVD Music Videos chart, selling 800 copies in its first week of release in the US.

Track listing
DVD 1 / Blu-ray

DVD 2

- Documental: “The Way of All Flesh Inside” (62 min):

References

External links
Official Gojira website
Trailer for Gojira’s The Flesh Alive

Gojira (band) video albums
2012 live albums
Live video albums
2012 video albums
Gojira (band) albums